The title Earl of Mulgrave has been created twice. The first time as a title in the Peerage of England and the second time as a Peerage of the United Kingdom.

The first creation was in the Peerage of England in 1626 for  Edmund Sheffield, 3rd Baron Sheffield KG, who served as Lord Lieutenant of Yorkshire from 1603 to 1619. The Sheffield family descended from Sir Edmund Sheffield, second cousin of Henry VIII, who in 1547 was raised to the Peerage of England as Baron Sheffield of Butterwick  and in 1549 was murdered in the streets of Norwich during Kett's Rebellion. Upon the 1st Earl's death in 1646 he was succeeded by his grandson Edmund, who was in turn  succeeded by his son John. This 3rd Earl of Mulgrave KG was a notable Tory politician of the late Stuart period, who served under Queen Anne as Lord Privy Seal and Lord President of the Council. He was created Marquess of Normanby in 1694 and Duke of Buckingham and Normanby in 1703. These titles became extinct on the death of his son, the 2nd Duke in 1735.

The second creation was in the Peerage of the United Kingdom in 1812 for Henry Phipps, 3rd Baron Mulgrave. He was a general in the Army as well as a prominent politician, and notably served as Foreign Secretary from 1805 to 1806 and as First Lord of the Admiralty from 1807 to 1810. His grandfather William Phipps had married Lady Catherine Annesley, who was the daughter and heiress of James Annesley, 3rd Earl of Anglesey and his wife Lady Catherine Darnley (an illegitimate daughter of King James II by his mistress Catherine Sedley, Countess of Dorchester). Lady Catherine Darnley had later married John Sheffield, 1st Duke of Buckingham and Normanby, and hence Henry Phipps, 3rd Baron Mulgrave was the step-great-grandson of the 1st Duke of Buckingham and Normanby. In 1812 this 3rd Baron Mulgrave was made Viscount Normanby, of Normanby in the County of York and Earl of Mulgrave, both titles in the Peerage of the United Kingdom. Upon his death in 1831, the 1st Earl of Mulgrave was succeeded by his eldest son Constantine. This 2nd Earl of Mulgrave  was also a noted politician and served as Lord Lieutenant of Ireland and as Home Secretary. In 1838 he was created Marquess of Normanby in the Peerage of the United Kingdom. As of 2010, the titles are held by Constantine Phipps, 5th Marquess of Normanby.

Other members of the Phipps family have also gained distinction. The Hon. Sir Charles Phipps, second son of the 1st Earl, was a prominent court official. Sir Constantine Phipps, son of the Hon. Edmund Phipps, third son of the 1st Earl, was British Ambassador to Belgium from 1900 to 1906, while his son Sir Eric Phipps was British Ambassador to Germany between 1933 and 1937 and to France between 1937 and 1939. Also, Sir William Phipps (or Phips), Governor of Massachusetts, was a member of another branch of the family.

Earls of Mulgrave, first creation (1626)
Other titles: Baron Sheffield (1547)
Edmund Sheffield, 3rd Baron Sheffield (c. 1564–1646), created Earl of Mulgrave in 1626
Edmund Sheffield, 2nd Earl of Mulgrave (1611–1658)
John Sheffield, 3rd Earl of Mulgrave (1647–1721), created Marquess of Normanby in 1694

Earls of Mulgrave, second creation (1812)
Other titles: Baron Mulgrave (1767), Baron Mulgrave (1794), Viscount Normanby (1812)
Henry Phipps, 3rd Baron Mulgrave (1755–1831),  created Earl of Mulgrave in 1812
Constantine Phipps, 2nd Earl of Mulgrave (1797–1863), created Marquess of Normanby in 1838

See also
Baron Sheffield
Baron Mulgrave
Marquess of Normanby
Duke of Buckingham and Normanby

Further reading
 

Earldoms in the Peerage of the United Kingdom
Extinct earldoms in the Peerage of England
1626 establishments in England
Noble titles created in 1626
Noble titles created in 1812